Associazione Polisportiva Dilettantistica Comunale Chions, or simply APC Chions, is an Italian association football club located in Chions, Friuli-Venezia Giulia. It currently plays in Eccellenza.

History
APC Chions was born on a day in June 1972. In the Zaghis room, in the presence of the Mayor of the time Olga Verardo and eighty members, the power of an idea becomes reality. The notarial deed of incorporation registers as founding members Gerardo Bertolo, Ermanno Bianchi, Luciano Bressan, Sergio Cusin, Giorgio Nardo and Mario Scacco. The first president of the new team is Ermanno Bianchi. Over time, Giuseppe Bressan, Cesare Santin, Carlo Gobat, Luciano Bressan, Bruno Lena, Primo Beraldo, Renato Bressan and Mauro Bressan follow one another. The latter is the longest in our history, from 2004 to today. After him his father Luciano Bressan, president for 13 seasons and Luciano's brother, Giuseppe, at the helm of the team for eight seasons.

In the early years, Chions played in the Pravisdomini field, from 1972 to 1974. With the following season it returned to Chions in the oratory field built together with the changing rooms and remained here until the 1984–85 season. From 1985–86 he finally found its home, the municipal field of via Garibaldi. In the spring of 1984 just that field, now ready, was weeded by unknown persons for half the surface. It therefore becomes necessary to remove the earth, bring it back and wait until the spring of the following year. It is the first of May 1985 when it is finally inaugurated with the friendly match between Chions and SV Feldkirchen (Carinthia). The construction of the structure took place with the mayor Aldo Presot while with the Mayor Loris Vian, on 5 October 1997, the new grandstand was inaugurated. On 30 August 2008, with Mayor Fabio Santin, the municipal stadium is dedicated to the young "Francesco Tesolin", who died prematurely at the age of twenty-two a few months earlier.

Chions plays 7 seasons in Terza Categoria (from 1972–73 to 1978–79). Promoted to Seconda Categoria, with 30 points and coaches, the pair Travani-Venier, for 3 championships remains (from 1979–80 to 1982–83). Promoted to Prima Categoria, with 42 points and Fiorin coach, it stays there for 3 seasons (from 1983–84 to 1985–86). Relegated to Seconda Categoria with 22 points, it plays there for 6 championships (from 1986–87 to 1992–93). Returns to Prima Categoria and stays there for 5 seasons (from 1993–94 to 1997–98). It reaches the Promozione, with 59 points and coach Gobat, in the spring of 1998 and plays 12 championships continuously in this category. In this period it risks relegation only once, in the 2001–02 season with 29 points, but is saved by coach Della Pietra. In 2004–05 it arrives 4th, with 50 points and still coach Della Pietra, but plays the playoffs with little luck. It still comes 4th with 51 points in 2009–10 with the coach Boccalon and again loses the playoffs. However, it is fished out and can participate in the 2010–11 championship of Eccellenza conducted by the same coach. Unfortunately, it arrives third from last and relegates back to Promozione. In the following season 2011–12, led by Vittore, it ranks second with 63 points and for the third time he loses the playoffs.

Finally, the 2012–2013 season brings the long-awaited second leap to Eccellenza. Still under the orders of Pino Vittore, the team plays a top promotion championship, arousing enormous enthusiasm among the sportsmen and the noisy, but very correct, young "ultras", admired in all the fields of the region. The final table sees it first with 73 points (the result of 23 wins, 4 draws and 3 defeats), 6 points behind A.S.D. Rivignano that follows it. The record attack scores 73 goals (27 are from the bomber Davide Francescutto, top scorer of the league, with 29 games played) and the iron defense is punched only 23 times (the starting goalkeeper Luca Peruch suffers 13 out of 23 appearances between the posts). The promotion already acquired takes place, two match-days before the end of the league, on 28 April 2013 at the end of the very tight match between Chions and ASD Fiume Veneto, which ended 5–2. The joy on the pitch and in the stands is indescribable and lasts for hours. The coach Pino Vittore and the president Mauro Bressan are carried in triumph. The official change of category takes place some time later with a great evening, which sees the managers of the regional and provincial FIGC, the protagonists and a flood of cheering supporters.

In 2013–2014 Eccellenza season, with confirmed coach Pino Vittore, sees the team always among the protagonists, with the final conquest of an honorable 6th place. However, there is a real gem: on 6 January 2014, Chions, on the mud of Cervignano pitch, won the Coppa Italia Dilettanti Friuli V.G., beating NK Kras Repen 2–1. It is a truly historic result, especially considering that it is new to category. He thus enters the national phase, but has no luck. However, it was nice to meet nice friends from Trentino (A.S.D. Mori Santo Stefano) and Veneto (F.C. Arzignano Valchiampo). In the 2014–2015 Eccellenza season the team is renewed a lot and changes coach. It passes to the orders of Sante Bernardo, who was Pino Vittore's deputy in the previous season. He always travels in the middle of the table, alternating between good and mediocre games. In the final standings he occupies 8th place. However, he reaches another historic record: for the second consecutive year he is a finalist in the Coppa Italia Dilettanti F.V.G., something that has never happened before. On 6 January 2015, the date on which the final was played, he had no luck and lost 2–3 against Virtus Corno. The 2015–2016 season brings a rather painful season in Eccellenza. Coach Sante Bernardo struggles to make the team express its potential and the first round ends with just 15 points. He is then replaced by Alessandro Lenisa who slowly gives confidence to the environment and plays a second round that brings 21 points, for a total of 36 points, which means 10th place and salvation in the final standings. The new coach has clear ideas and proposes important goals that excite players and managers. Ironically, this season the forward Corvaglia plays, who with 18 goals is the top scorer of the Chions in the 6 championships played in Excellence. In the 2016–2017 Eccellenza season the team, coached by Alessandro Lenisa, knows how to assert itself and gives great satisfaction. It doesn't score much (only 29 goals to his credit), but he has an iron defense that concedes just 24 goals and is the best in the league, tied with two others. The final classification sees it in 7th place with 43 points. Fairness on the pitch and in the stands is extraordinary and leads to the conquest of the Fair-play Cup. The same Cup is also won by the Junior team. It is a clear sign that even in football it is possible to play with full respect for fairness and sportsmanship.

The 2017–2018 Eccellenza season is a triumphal ride for the team, which is practically in the lead for the whole season. The coach Alessandro Lenisa surpasses himself and knows how to obtain extraordinary results from the group. The championship, and therefore the promotion to Serie D, was won 4 match-days early and with 68 points, 5 more than the second ASD Lumignacco. The goals scored are 68 and those suffered 26. Out of 30 games played, the victories are 21, the draws 5, the defeats 4. For the second consecutive year the Fair-play Cup is also won. On 22 April 2018, a 4–1 victory against the A.S.D. San Luigi, the mathematical certainty of the historic promotion to Serie D arrives and at the end of the game the irrepressible joy for the result explodes on the pitch and in the stands. The coach and the President are carried in triumph and a party begins that will end late at night. Party that will be completed a few weeks later at the Le Roste lake in the presence of the regional and provincial sports authorities and the Mayor of Chions Renato Santin, who recognizes the merits of a club that knows how to best manage hundreds of young athletes.

Recent seasons

Key

Honours
Eccellenza Friuli-Venezia Giulia (1st regional level)
Winners: 2017–18

Promozione Friuli-Venezia Giulia (2nd regional level)
Winners: 2012–13

Prima Categoria Friuli-Venezia Giulia (3rd regional level)
Winners: 1997–987

Seconda Categoria Friuli-Venezia Giulia (4th regional level)
Winners: 1992–93

Terza Categoria Friuli-Venezia Giulia (lowest regional level)
Winners: 1978–79

Coppa Italia Dilettanti Friuli-Venezia Giulia
Winners: 2013–14
Runners-up: 2014–15

Colors and badge 
The team's colors are yellow and blue.

References

External links
Official website 
Chions page @ friuligol.it
Chions page @ tuttocampo.it
Chions page @ facebook.com

Chions
Chions
Chions